There are over 177 species of fish in the US state of Oklahoma, at least 7% of which are not native.

Species include:
Alabama shad (Alosa alabamae)
Alligator gar (Atractosteus spatula)
American eel (Anguilla rostrata)
American gizzard shad (Dorosoma cepedianum)
American paddlefish (Polyodon spathula)
Arkansas darter (Etheostoma cragini)
Arkansas River shiner (Notropis girardi)
Banded darter (Etheostoma zonale)
Banded pygmy sunfish (Elassoma zonatum)
Banded sculpin (Cottus carolinae)
Bantam sunfish (Lepomis symmetricus)
Bigeye chub (Hybopsis amblops)
Bigeye shiner (Notropis boops)
Bigmouth buffalo (Ictiobus cyprinellus)
Black buffalo (Ictiobus niger)
Black bullhead (Ameiurus melas)
Black crappie (Pomoxis nigromaculatus)
Black redhorse (Moxostoma duquesni)
Blackside darter (Percina maculata)
Blackspot shiner (Notropis atrocaudalis)
Blackspotted topminnow (Fundulus olivaceus)
Blackstripe topminnow (Fundulus notatus)
Blacktail shiner (Cyprinella venusta)
Blue catfish (Ictalurus furcatus)
Blue sucker (Cycleptus elongatus)
Bluegill (Lepomis macrochirus)
Bluehead shiner (Pteronotropis hubbsi)
Bluntface shiner (Cyprinella camura)
Bluntnose darter (Etheostoma chlorosomum)
Bluntnose minnow (Pimephales notatus)
Bowfin (Amia calva)
Brindled madtom (Noturus miurus)
Brook silverside (Labidesthes sicculus)
Brown bullhead (Ameiurus nebulosus)
Brown trout (Salmo trutta)
Bullhead minnow (Pimephales vigilax)
Cardinal shiner (Luxilus cardinalis)
Carmine shiner (Notropis percobromus)
Central stoneroller (Campostoma anomalum)
Chain pickerel (Esox niger)
Channel catfish (Ictalurus punctatus)
Channel darter (Percina copelandi)
Chestnut lamprey (Ichthyomyzon castaneus)
Chub shiner (Notropis potteri)
Common carp (Cyprinus carpio)
Common logperch (Percina caprodes)
Common shiner (Luxilus cornutus)
Creek chub (Semotilus atromaculatus)
Creek chubsucker (Erimyzon oblongus)
Creole darter (Etheostoma collettei)
Crystal darter (Crystallaria asprella)
Cypress darter (Etheostoma proeliare)
Cypress minnow (Hybognathus hayi)
Dollar sunfish (Lepomis marginatus)
Dusky darter (Percina sciera)
Emerald shiner (Notropis atherinoides)
Fantail darter (Etheostoma flabellare)
Fathead minnow (Pimephales promelas)
Flathead catfish (Pylodictis olivaris)
Flathead chub (Platygobio gracilis)
Flathead mullet (Mugil cephalus)
Flier (Centrarchus macropterus)
Freckled madtom (Noturus nocturnus)
Freshwater drum (Aplodinotus grunniens)
Ghost shiner (Notropis buchanani)
Golden redhorse (Moxostoma erythrurum)
Golden shiner (Notemigonus crysoleucas)
Golden topminnow (Fundulus chrysotus)
Goldeye (Hiodon alosoides)
Goldfish (Carassius auratus auratus)
Goldstripe darter (Etheostoma parvipinne)
Grass pickerel (Esox americanus vermiculatus)
Gravel chub (Erimystax x-punctatus)
Green sunfish (Lepomis cyanellus)
Greenside darter (Etheostoma blennioides)
Harlequin darter (Etheostoma histrio)
Highfin carpsucker (Carpiodes velifer)
Hybrid striped bass (Morone chrysops × M. saxatilis)
Inland silverside (Menidia beryllina)
Ironcolor shiner (Notropis chalybaeus)
Johnny darter (Etheostoma nigrum)
Kiamichi shiner (Notropis ortenburgeri)
Lake chubsucker (Erimyzon sucetta)
Largemouth bass (Micropterus salmoides)
Largescale stoneroller (Campostoma oligolepis)
Least darter (Etheostoma microperca)
Leopard darter (Percina pantherina)
Longear sunfish (Lepomis megalotis)
Longnose darter (Percina nasuta)
Longnose gar (Lepisosteus osseus)
Lowland topminnow (Fundulus blairae)
Mexican tetra (Astyanax mexicanus)
Mimic shiner (Notropis volucellus)
Mississippi silvery minnow (Hybognathus nuchalis)
Mooneye (Hiodon tergisus)
Eastern mosquitofish (Gambusia holbrooki)
Western mosquitofish (Gambusia affinis)
Mountain madtom (Noturus eleutherus)
Mud darter (Etheostoma asprigene)
Neosho madtom (Noturus placidus)
Northern hogsucker (Hypentelium nigricans)
Northern pike (Esox lucius)
Northern studfish (Fundulus catenatus)
Orangebelly darter (Etheostoma radiosum)
Orangespotted sunfish (Lepomis humilis)
Orangethroat darter (Etheostoma spectabile)
Ouachita shiner (Lythrurus snelsoni)
Ozark cavefish (Amblyopsis rosae)
Ozark minnow (Notropis nubilus)
Pallid shiner (Hybopsis amnis)
Peppered shiner (Notropis perpallidus)
Pirate perch (Aphredoderus sayanus)
Plains killifish (Fundulus zebrinus)
Plains minnow (Hybognathus placitus)
Plains topminnow (Fundulus sciadicus)
Prairie chub (Macrhybopsis australis)
Pugnose minnow (Opsopoeodus emiliae)
Quillback (Carpiodes cyprinus)
Rainbow trout (Oncorhynchus mykiss)
Red River pupfish (Cyprinodon rubrofluviatilis)
Red River shiner (Notropis bairdi)
Red shiner (Cyprinella lutrensis)
Redbreast sunfish (Lepomis auritus)
Redear sunfish (Lepomis microlophus)
Redfin darter (Etheostoma whipplei)
Redfin shiner (Lythrurus umbratilis)
Redspot chub (Nocomis asper)
Redspot darter (Etheostoma artesiae)
Redspotted sunfish (Lepomis miniatus)
Ribbon shiner (Lythrurus fumeus)
River carpsucker (Carpiodes carpio)
River darter (Percina shumardi)
River redhorse (Moxostoma carinatum)
River shiner (Notropis blennius)
Rock bass (Ambloplites rupestris)
Rocky shiner (Notropis suttkusi)
Rosyface shiner (Notropis rubellus)
Sand shiner (Notropis stramineus)
Sauger (Sander canadensis)
Scaly sand darter (Ammocrypta vivax)
Shadow bass (Ambloplites ariommus)
Shoal chub (Macrhybopsis hyostoma)
Shorthead redhorse (Moxostoma macrolepidotum)
Shortnose gar (Lepisosteus platostomus)
Shovelnose sturgeon (Scaphirhynchus platorynchus)
Silver chub (Macrhybopsis storeriana)
Silver Redhorse (moxostoma anisurum)
Silverband shiner (Notropis shumardi)
Skipjack shad (Alosa chrysochloris)
Slender madtom (Noturus exilis)
Slenderhead darter (Percina phoxocephala)
Slim minnow (Pimephales tenellus)
Slough darter (Etheostoma gracile)
Smallmouth bass (Micropterus dolomieu)
Smallmouth buffalo (Ictiobus bubalus)
Southern brook lamprey (Ichthyomyzon gagei)
Southern redbelly dace (Chrosomus erythrogaster)
Speckled darter (Etheostoma stigmaeum)
Spotfin shiner (Cyprinella spiloptera)
Spotted bass (Micropterus punctulatus)
Spotted gar (Lepisosteus oculatus)
Spotted sucker (Minytrema melanops)
Steelcolor shiner (Cyprinella whipplei)
Stippled darter (Etheostoma punctulatum)
Stonecat (Noturus flavus)
Striped bass (Morone saxatilis)
Striped shiner (Luxilus chrysocephalus)
Suckermouth minnow (Phenacobius mirabilis)
Swamp darter (Etheostoma fusiforme)
Tadpole madtom (Noturus gyrinus)
Taillight shiner (Notropis maculatus)
Threadfin shad (Dorosoma petenense)
Walleye (Sander vitreus)
Warmouth (Lepomis gulosus)
Wedgespot shiner (Notropis greenei)
Western sand darter (Ammocrypta clara)
White bass (Morone chrysops)
White crappie (Pomoxis annularis)
White sucker (Catostomus commersonii)
Yellow bass (Morone mississippiensis)
Yellow bullhead (Ameiurus natalis)
Yellow perch (Perca flavescens)

Sources

Fish
 Oklahoma